"Down 4 Whateva" is a song by American girl group Nuttin' Nyce. The song, which was recorded for the group's debut album of the same name, was released as the first promotional single for the soundtrack to the 1994 film A Low Down Dirty Shame.

The chorus includes the refrain from Back to Life (However Do You Want Me) by Soul II Soul.

Track listing
12", 33 RPM, Vinyl (Promo)
"Down 4 Whateva" (LP Version) - 4:50
"Down 4 Whateva" (Mr. Lee's Remix) - 6:05
"Down 4 Whateva" (LP Instrumental) - 4:50
"Down 4 Whateva" (Mr. Lee's Remix Instrumental) - 6:05

CD (Promo)
"Down 4 Whateva" (Radio Edit) - 4:20
"Down 4 Whateva" (LP Version) - 4:52
"Down 4 Whateva" (Mr. Lee's Remix) - 6:02

Personnel
Information taken from Discogs.
additional production – Mr. Lee, Wayne Williams
engineering – Stephen George, Adam Kudzin, Chris Trevett
instruments – K. Fingers
mastering – Tom Coyne
production – Art & Rhythm
remixing – Mr. Lee
writing – L. Campbell, N. Hooper, S. Law, O. Ponder, B. Romeo, L. Wallace, C. Wheeler

Chart performance

Notes

1994 singles
1994 songs
Jive Records singles
Songs written by Jazzie B
Songs written by Nellee Hooper